Cammag is a team sport originating on the Isle of Man. It is closely related to the Scottish game of shinty and is similar to the Irish game of hurling. Once the most widespread sport on Man, it ceased to be played around 1900 after the introduction of association football, though it has experienced a revival in the 21st century.

Equipment involves a stick (meaning "little curved thing") and a ball (crick or crig) with anything between four and two hundred players. Sometimes whole towns and villages took part, or even played each other. The camman can be any stick with a bent end, and is similar in design to the caman in shinty, both unlike the Irish camán, having no blade. A gorse wood camman, if of suitable size and shape, was a very much treasured possession. The crick can be made from cork or wood, and varied from circular to egg-shaped, sized from approximately two inches in circumference to 'the size of a fist'. Old accounts tell that the crick was sometimes covered in cloth or leather.

The Manx word Cammag, as in modern Scottish Gaelic and Irish camán, is derived from the Gaelic root word cam, meaning bent.

Cammag season started on Hunt the Wren Day (26 December) and was only played by men (of all ages) during the winter. Corris's Close (now Athol Street) was the chief playing-ground in the town of Peel.

In modern times, an annual match of cammag is played in St John's.

There is evidence to show that Cammag had strong links to Welsh Bando, there are records in Wales that teams would have been games played all over the place with 20–30 men a side and played on a pitch 200 metres long. Once a year there would have been the very biggest games with hundreds of men to a team and numbers would not have been counted but more of a free for all.

History and recent matches

In his book 'Isle of Man Hockey', Kit Gawne suggests that the game of cammag may have been introduced to the Isle of Man by missionaries.

The earliest written record of the game dates to 1760, when three men and a boy were brought before the church court for playing cammag on a Sunday.

An open Cammag match is played on Boxing Day/Hunt the Wren Day (26 December) on the Tynwald field at St John's. Matches are held between the North and the South of the island. Research by David Fisher in the archives of Manx National Heritage clarified that the Northern line historically ran from the Grand Island Hotel to Niarbyl, south of Peel. The game usually starts at 2 p.m., and is played over three 20-minute periods.

Teams are informal and unregulated, often numbering more than 50 people (both males and females) on the field – historic commentary cites matches played with anywhere between four and two hundred players. In recent years, the match has been refereed by local radio presenter John Kaneen who revived the game in recent years. Playing equipment is supposed to consist of a bent stick, though there are many variations on the design. The game is a physically demanding contact sport, and protective equipment is advised.

The game usually revolves around a central pack, where a large number of players are confined in a small space, and the ball cannot move large distances. Breakout attacks down the open wings occasionally take place, though the large number of players in the centre of the field makes it difficult to attack the staked-out goals from outside positions.

Isle of Man Cammag Association
In January 2014 it was announced that the Isle of Man Cammag Association had been founded to act as the governing body for the game. It was expected that a league of 7 teams would have been created, with the first game expected to have taken place on 5 July 2015. However, the expected association did not materialise, and no league was ever set up. Cammag remains without a governing body, and without a formal set of rules.

References

Sources

 
 Isle of Man.com

External links 

 Video of cammag being played from Culture Vannin.

Team sports
Celtic words and phrases
Manx culture
Sport in the Isle of Man